The Solar Electric Light Fund (SELF) is a non-profit organization, established in 1990 and based in Washington, D.C. Their mission is to design and implement solar energy solutions to assist those in poor communities where energy, education, health care, and agricultural development are at risk. Since its establishment, SELF has completed several projects in more than 20 countries including a solar powered drip irrigation in Benin, a health care centre in Haiti, telemedicine in the Amazon rainforest, online learning platform in South Africa, and a microenterprise development in Nigeria.

Methodology
SELF believes that energy access is essential to achieving the Sustainable Development Goals. SELF's Whole Village Development Model takes an integrated approach for community empowerment by using a mix of solar energy solutions to improve the lives of the 1.5 billion people who don't have access to electricity around the world. By working closely with communities and adhering to its principles of SELF Determination, SELF Help and SELF Reliance, it seeks to provide benefits in:
 Education: powering lights, computers and wireless internet services.
 Health: powering facility lights, labs, diagnostic equipment and vaccine refrigerators.
 Water & Agriculture: powering water wells and pumps for clean drinking water and year-round crop irrigation.
 Enterprise: powering centers for small businesses and providing electricity for machinery and equipment.
 Community: electrifying homes, community centers and street lighting.

History

Foundation

SELF was founded in 1990 by Neville Williams, an award-winning journalist and author, who had experience actively promoting solar power as a staffer with the U.S. Department of Energy during the Carter administration.  For much of the 1990s, SELF's primary mission was to deliver solar home systems – 50-watt units installed at the household level that could generate enough power to run a few compact fluorescent lights, a radio, and a small black and white television for four or five hours each evening. The electricity generated by the solar panel is stored in a battery, which then provides power at night and during rainy weather.

In its early projects, SELF used funds donated by private philanthropies to buy home-size photovoltaic systems in bulk on the open market, usually enough for one small village at a time. SELF then sold the systems to villagers in developing areas, in partnership, where possible, with in-country nonprofit agencies. Each participating household made a 20 percent down payment on a solar energy system and paid off the balance – usually between $300 and $400 – over several years. The buyers'payments were pooled in a local revolving loan fund from which their neighbors could borrow to buy their own solar power gear. SELF used a portion of the proceeds on the equipment to establish a local dealership and train residents as solar installers and technicians. The revolving loan funds made it possible for villagers to finance the continued dissemination of solar systems in their areas.

Focusing on the Home & Creating SELCO

Over time, SELF began to evolve more elaborate project structures. In a joint venture with local partners in India, SELF formed a for-profit subsidiary using India's Ministry of New and Renewable Energy to tap World Bank funds set aside specifically for photovoltaic installations. In part, the company used the money to finance rural co-ops' bulk purchase of solar-energy systems for their members, to install the systems, and to train local technicians. The company then repaid the World Bank's loan from funds collected from the co-ops.

In 1997, SELF decided to launch a for-profit affiliate, the Solar Electric Light Company, or SELCO, based in Bangalore, India, whose goal would be to sell solar home systems in the states of Karnataka and Andhra Pradesh. Neville Williams stepped down from his role with SELF to run SELCO, and SELF's board of directors appointed Robert A. Freling as the new executive director. Since 1995, SELCO has sold, serviced, and financed over 115,000 solar systems.

Expanding Services

Beginning in 2000, SELF embarked on its next generation of projects that would seek to harness solar energy for things such as advancing water pumping and purification, purveying electrification to rural schools and health clinics, providing power to small businesses and micro-enterprises, and facilitating communication access.

The first opportunity to fulfill this expanded vision was found in South Africa, where SELF had been working on a project to install solar home systems in the Valley of a Thousand Hills, in the province of KwaZulu-Natal. SELF installed a 1.5-kilowatt solar array, which generated enough electricity to power approximately 20 PCs donated by Dell Computers and a small satellite dish that delivered Internet access to Myeka High School. This was the first solar-powered computer lab built in South Africa, and the pass rate at Myeka High School jumped from 30 percent to 70 percent within a year and a half of installation.

Whole Village Development Model

In 2003, SELF found the opportunity to implement a "Whole-Village" approach when the U.S. Department of Energy (DOE) invited SELF to carry out a solar electrification project in Nigeria. With support from the DOE, SELF equipped three villages in Jigawa State, in northern Nigeria, with solar power systems for a community water-pumping system, a health clinic, a primary school, street lighting, a portable irrigation pump, and a micro-enterprise center. Since then, SELF has continued to implement this model in other project countries.

Past Projects

SELF has worked in over 20 countries, using solar energy to power health clinics, schools, community centers, water pumps, mosques, drip irrigation, streetlights, and micro-enterprise centers. In addition to its current project sites, SELF has worked in Bhutan, Brazil, Burundi, China, India, Indonesia, Kenya, Lesotho, the Navajo Nation, Nepal, Nigeria, Rwanda, the Solomon Islands, South Africa, Sri Lanka, Tanzania, Uganda, Vietnam, and Zimbabwe.

Current Projects

Benin

In partnership with the International Crops Research Institute for the Semi-Arid Tropics (ICRISAT) and Association pour le Developpement Economique Social et Culturel de Kalalé (ADESCA), SELF has installed a total of eleven of its Solar Market Gardens™ (SMG), an innovative, unique solar-powered drip irrigation system, for women farming collectives in Dunkassa and Bessassi, two villages in the arid, northern part of the country.

A two-year study conducted by Stanford University's Program on Food Security and the Environment department appearing in the Proceedings of the National Academy of Sciences found that SELF's SMGs, "significantly augments both household income and nutritional intake, particularly during the dry season, and is cost effective compared to alternative technologies."

In addition to the SMGs, SELF has also installed three community water wells, streetlights, and solar systems to power two schools and a health center. In 2014, SELF finished the installation of a solar micro-grid that will power a micro-enterprise center in Bessassi, and construction of a second micro-enterprise center in Dunkassa is nearing completion. SELF's future plans include replicating the potable water pumping stations in two more villages, assessing the potential for vaccine refrigerators at solar-electrified clinics, preparing for a pilot internet café, and planning a solar home lantern program.

Haiti

After the 2010 earthquake, SELF and Partners In Health teamed to develop the Rebuilding Haiti Initiative to fully power eight health centers. SELF has also installed 100 solar powered streetlights in tent camps to increase safety, and in collaboration with NRG Energy, Inc. and the Clinton Bush Haiti Fund, SELF has completed the Sun Lights the Way: Brightening Boucan-Carré project by installing solar systems to power a fish farm, 20 schools, a Solar Market Garden™, and a microenterprise center. The success of this project has increased the quality of education for students in remote areas and has contributed to ensuring year-round food security.

In 2013, SELF solarized an additional seven schools to serve nearly 2,000 students, and also installed 20 solar-powered streetlights around Boucan-Carré in dangerous areas. Currently, SELF is installing two solar micro-grids that will provide electricity to 15,000 people in Port-à-Piment, Côteaux, Roche-à-Bateaux, and Fe-Yo-Bien, to be completed in 2015.

Colombia

With support from Acción Social (a governmental agency in Colombia) and Microsoft, SELF conducted a week-long site assessment and determined that deploying solar electric systems for the indigenous Arhuaco, Kogi and Wiwa communities in the Sierra Nevada mountains of northern Colombia is feasible. The project, a part of the Cordon Ambiental y Tradicional de la Sierra Nevada de Santa Marta initiative led by Acción Social, is intended to power the health and educational facilities in the villages, along with community lighting systems at select locations.

SELF was selected as a Grand Challenges Explorations winner, an initiative funded by the Bill & Melinda Gates Foundation, for groundbreaking research in solar powered direct-drive freezers to support global health and development. To support immunization efforts at two remote village health posts in the mountains of Colombia's Sierra Nevada de Santa Marta, SELF successfully field-tested three solar powered direct-drive vaccine refrigerators and the first commercially available direct-drive, battery-free vaccine icepack freezer. Following the tests, the fridge and freezer were donated to the village of Sabana Crespo.

SELF is also working on plans to install a solar energy based microgrid in the village of Sabana Crespo to power coffee facilities, the village general store, a health care clinic which includes a new laboratory, and the village's school and cafeteria.

Partnerships
In alphabetical order

 350 Media
 AEE Solar
 Alstom Foundation
 Amazon Association
 Applied Materials
 Bosch
 Centre for Renewable Energy, Kathmandu
 Cermet Materials
 Chadbourne & Parke LLP
 Clinton Bush Haiti Fund
 Clinton HIV/AIDS Initiative (now the Clinton Health Access Initiative)
 Columbia University's Mailman School of Public Health
 Community Energy
 Copper Alliance
 Creative Energies
 Dell Computers South Africa
 Dian Fossey Gorilla Fund
 Dow Corning
 East Penn Manufacturing 
 Elizabeth Glaser Pediatric AIDS Foundation
 Khaya ICT (South Africa)
 EOPLLY New Energy Technology
 Exxon Mobil Corporation
 General Cable
 Good Energies
 Google.org
 Guadalcanal Rural Electrification Agency (GREA)
 Habitat for Humanity International
 Government of Haiti
 Hemlock Semiconductor Corporation
 Institute for Sustainable Energy and Development
 Inter-American Development Bank
 International Crops Research Institute for the Semi-Arid Tropics (ICRISAT)
 Jane Goodall Institute
 Javelin Logistics
 Johnson & Johnson
 Jigawa State government

 LearnThings (South Africa)
 Make It Right Foundation
 Microsoft
 Millennium Villages Project
 Mr. LongArm, Inc
 National Renewable Energy Laboratory
 Nelson Mandela Institute
 NRG Energy, Inc.
 Omni Instruments
 Oprah Winfrey Foundation
 Outback Power Systems
 Partners In Health
 Q-Cells
 Royal Society for Protection of Nature, Bhutan
 SCS Renewables
 SMA Solar Technology
 Sol
 Solar Liberty Foundation
 SolarWorld
 Solmetric
 Standard Solar
 Stanford University, Institute for Food Security and the Environment
 Sunsense Solar
 Sunset Lighting
 Suntech
 Sun Power Foundation
 Trina Solar
 Trojan Battery Company
 United Nations Environment Programme
 U.S. Department of Energy
 Vietnam Women's Union (VWU)
 Village Health Works
 WattPlot
 Wind, Water, & Energy Conservation
 World Bank Development Marketplace Award
 Yingli

Awards
 2011- Energy Institute Award for Best Community Initiative
 2008- King Hussein Leadership Prize, Presented to Robert Freling
 2008- Named a Tech Awards Laureate by the Tech Museum of Innovation
 2006- World Bank Development Marketplace Winner
 2005- Chevron Conservation Award
 2002- Tech Museum of Innovation Awards Finalist
 1999- Templeton Award, Presented to SELF Board Member, Freeman Dyson
 1998- Global Green Environmental Award

Articles
 Wood, Elisa. "Doing Good by Doing Solar." Renewable Energy World Magazine, 12 July 2013. http://www.renewableenergyworld.com/rea/news/article/2013/07/doing-good-by-doing-solar 
 Butler, Erin. "In India, SELCO Brings Solar Power to the People." The Christian Science Monitor, 15 Jan. 2013. http://www.csmonitor.com/World/Making-a-difference/Change-Agent/2013/0115/In-India-SELCO-brings-solar-power-to-the-people
 Taylor, Darren. "Solar Energy Illuminates Darkest Parts of Africa." Voice of America, 24 Aug. 2012. http://www.voanews.com/content/solar-energy-illuminates-darkest-parts-of-africa/1495451.html
 Fox, Zoe. "SELF Taps the Sun to Break the Cycle of Poverty." Mashable, 23 April 2012. http://mashable.com/2012/04/13/solar-electric-light-fund/
 Eaton, Joe. "Solar Energy Brings Food, Water, and Light to West Africa." National Geographic, 13 March 2012. http://news.nationalgeographic.com/news/energy/2012/03/120314-solar-drip-irrigation-in-benin-africa/
 Daniel, Trenton. "Haiti Bringing Electricity to Business-starved Projects." The Denver Post, 29 Feb. 2012. http://www.denverpost.com/nationworld/ci_20066574#ixzz1oSrH5NJp
 Duda, Steve. "Solar Brings Better Medical Care in Haiti." Earth Techling, 11 Nov. 2011. http://www.earthtechling.com/2011/11/solar-powers-better-medical-care-in-haiti/

References

Development charities based in the United States
Solar power
Appropriate technology organizations